The members of the New Jersey Legislature are chosen from 40 electoral districts. Each district elects one Senator and two Assemblymen.

New Jersey is one of only seven states with nested state legislative districts, in which the lower house's districts are coextensive with a single state Senate seat. In New Jersey, each district elects one Senator and two Assembly members. (States which have similar practices are Arizona, Idaho, Maryland, North Dakota, South Dakota and Washington).

Districts are reapportioned decennially by the New Jersey Apportionment Commission following each United States Census, as provided by Article IV, Section III of the state Constitution.

The legislative districts listed below went into effect with the swearing-in of the 221st Legislature in 2024. They were used for regular elections from 2023 through 2029 following the 2020 United States Census. The districts were supposed to go into effect with the 2021 elections, however, this was delayed due to the census information being postponed due to the COVID-19 pandemic. The districts are as follows:

District 1

Avalon Borough,
Cape May City,
Cape May Point Borough,
Commercial Township,
Corbin City,
Dennis Township,
Downe,
Estell Manor,
Fairfield,
Lawerence,
Lower Township,
Maurice River Township,
Middle Township,
Millville City,
North Wildwood City,
Ocean City,
Sea Isle City,
Somers Point City,
Stone Harbor Borough,
Upper Township,
Vineland City,
Weymouth,
West Cape May Borough,
West Wildwood Borough,
Wildwood City,
Wildwood Crest Borough,
Woodbine Borough

District 2

Absecon City,
Atlantic City,
Brigantine City,
Egg Harbor Township,
Galloway Township,
Hamilton Township,
Linwood City,
Longport Borough,
Margate City,
Northfield City,
Pleasantville City,
Port Republic City,
Somers Point,
Ventnor City,

District 3

Alloway Township,
Carneys Point Township,
Clayton Borough,
Deerfield
East Greenwich Township,
Elk Township,
Elmer Borough,
Elsinboro Township,
Glassboro,
Greenwich Township (Cumberland),
Greenwich Township (Gloucester),
Harrison Township,
Hopewell Township,
Logan Township,
Lower Alloways Creek Township,
Mannington Township,
Mantua Township,
National Park Borough,
Newfield,
Oldmans Township,
Paulsboro Borough,
Penns Grove Borough,
Pennsville Township,
Pilesgrove Township,
Pitman,
Pittsgrove Township,
Quinton Township,
Salem City,
Shiloh Borough,
South Harrison Township,
Stow Creek Township,
Swedesboro Borough,
Upper Deerfield Township,
Upper Pittsgrove Township,
Wenonah Borough,
West Deptford Township,
Woodstown Borough,
Woolwich Township

District 4

Buena,
Buena Vista,
Chesilhurst,
Franklin Township,
Gloucester Township,
Monroe Township,
Newfield Borough,
Washington Township,
Waterford,
Winslow

District 5

Audubon Borough,
Barrington Borough,
Bellmawr Borough,
Brooklawn Borough,
Camden City,
Collingswood,
Deptford Township,
Gloucester City,
Haddon Heights Borough,
Merchantville,
Mount Ephraim Borough,
Pennsauken,
Runnemede Borough,
Woodbury City,
Woodbury Heights Borough,
Woodlynne Borough

District 6

Audubon Park Borough,
Berlin Borough,
Berlin Township,
Cherry Hill Township,
Clementon,
Gibbsboro Borough,
Haddon Township,
Haddonfield Borough,
Hi-Nella,
Laurel Springs,
Lawnside,
Lindenwold,
Magnolia,
Maple Shade,
Oaklyn Borough,
Pine Hill Borough,
Somerdale,
Stratford,
Tavistock Borough,
Voorhees Township

District 7

Beverly City,
Bordentown,
Bordentown Township,
Burlington City,
Burlington Township,
Cinnaminson Township,
Delanco Township,
Delran Township,
Edgewater Park Township,
Fieldsboro,
Florence Township,
Moorestown,
Mount Laurel,
Palmyra Borough,
Riverside Township,
Riverton Borough,
Willingboro Township

District 8

Bass River,
Chesterfield Township,
Eastampton Township,
Egg Harbor City, New Jersey,
Evesham Township,
Folsom,
Hainesport Township,
Hammonton,
Lumberton Township,
Mansfield Township,
Medford Lakes Borough,
Medford Township,
Mount Holly,
Mullica,
New Hanover,
Pemberton Borough,
Pemberton Township,
Shamong Township,
Southampton Township,
Springfield Township,
Tabernacle Township,
Washington Township,
Westampton,
Woodland Township,
Wrightstown Borough

District 9

Barnegat Light Borough,
Barnegat Township,
Beach Haven Borough,
Beachwood Borough,
Berkeley Township,
Eagleswood Township,
Harvey Cedars Borough,
Lacey Township,
Lakehurst Borough,
Little Egg Harbor Township,
Long Beach Township,
Manchester Township,
Ocean Gate Borough,
Ocean Township,
Pine Beach Borough,
Ship Bottom Borough,
Stafford Township,
Surf City Borough,
Tuckerton Borough,

District 10

Bay Head Borough,
Brielle,
Brick Township,
Island Heights Borough,
Lavallette Borough,
Manasquan Borough,
Mantoloking Borough,
Point Pleasant Beach Borough,
Point Pleasant Borough,
Sea Girt,
Seaside Heights Borough,
Seaside Park Borough,
Spring Lake,
Spring Lake Heights,
South Toms River Borough,
Toms River Township

District 11

Allenhurst Borough,
Asbury Park City,
Bradley Beach Borough,
Colts Neck,
Deal Borough,
Eatontown Borough,
Fairhaven,
Freehold Borough,
Freehold Township,
Interlaken Borough,
Loch Arbour Village,
Long Branch City,
Neptune City Borough,
Neptune Township,
Ocean Township,
Red Bank,
Shrewsbury,
Shrewsbury Township,
Tinton Falls

District 12

Allentown,
Englishtown Borough,
Helmetta,
Jackson Township,
Manalapan Township,
Matawan,
Millstone Township,
North Hanover,
Old Bridge,
Plumsted Township,
Roosevelt,
Spotswood,
Upper Freehold

District 13

Aberdeen Township,
Atlantic Highlands,
Hazlet Township,
Highlands,
Holmdel Township,
Keansburg Borough,
Keyport Borough,
Little Silver,
Marlboro Township,
Middletown Township,
Monmouth Beach,
Oceanport,
Rumson
Sea Bright,
Union Beach,
West Long Branch

District 14

Cranbury Township,
East Windsor,
Hamilton Township,
Hightstown,
Jamesburg Borough,
Monroe Township,
Plainsboro Township,
Robbinsville Township

District 15

Delaware Township,
East Amwell,
Ewing Township,
Frenchtown,
Hopewell Borough,
Hopewell Township,
Kingwood,
Lambertville,
Lawrence Township,
Pennington Borough,
Stockton,
Trenton City,
West Amwell,
West Windsor

District 16

Branchburg Township,
Clinton,
Clinton Township,
Flemington,
High Bridge,
Hillsborough Township,
Lebanon Borough,
Millstone Borough,
Montgomery Township,
Princeton,
Raritan Borough,
Readington,
Rocky Hill Borough,
Somerville Borough,
South Brunswick

District 17

Franklin Township,
New Brunswick City,
North Brunswick Township,
Piscataway Township
South Bound Brook

District 18

East Brunswick Township,
Edison Township,
Highland Park,
Metuchen Borough,
Milltown,
South Plainfield Borough,
South River Borough,

District 19

Carteret Borough,
Perth Amboy City,
Sayreville Borough,
South Amboy City,
Woodbridge Township

District 20

Elizabeth City,
Kenilworth Borough,
Roselle Borough,
Union Township

District 21

Berkeley Heights Township,
Bernards,
Bernardsville,
Chatham Borough,
Chatham Township,
Dunellen,
Far Hills,
Garwood Borough,
Gladstone,
Green Brook,
Long Hill Township,
Middlesex,
Mountainside Borough,
New Providence Borough,
Peapack,
Springfield Township,
Summit City,
Warren Township,
Watchung Borough,
Westfield Town

District 22

Clark Township,
Cranford,
Fanwood Borough,
Linden City,
North Plainfield Borough,
Plainfield City,
Rahway City,
Roselle Park,
Scotch Plains Township,
Winfield Township

District 23

Alexandria Township,
Alpha Borough,
Bedminster,
Belvidere Town,
Bethlehem Township,
Blairstown Township,
Bloomsbury Borough,
Bound Brook,
Bridgewater Township,
Franklin Township (Hunterdon County),
Franklin Township (Warren County),
Frelinghuysen Township,
Glen Gardner Borough,
Greenwich Township,
Hackettstown Town,
Hampton Borough,
Hardwick Township,
Harmony Township,
Holland Township,
Hope Township,
Knowlton Township,
Lebanon Township,
Liberty Township,
Lopatcong Township,
Mansfield Township,
Manville,
Milford Borough,
Oxford Township,
Phillipsburg Town,
Pohatcong Township,
Raritan Borough,
Somerville,
Union Township,
Washington Borough,
Washington Township,
White Township

District 24

Allamuchy,
Andover Borough,
Andover Township,
Branchville Borough,
Byram Township,
Chester,
Chester Township,
Frankford Township,
Franklin Borough,
Fredon Township,
Green Township,
Hamburg Borough,
Hampton Township,
Hardyston Township,
Hopatcong Borough,
Independence,
Lafayette Township,
Montague Township,
Mount Olive Township,
Netcong Borough,
Newton Town,
Ogdensburg Borough,
Roxbury,
Sandyston Township,
Sparta Township,
Stanhope Borough,
Stillwater Township,
Sussex Borough,
Vernon Township,
Walpack Township,
Wantage Township,
Washington Township

District 25

Boonton Township,
Butler,
Dover Town,
Harding,
Jefferson Township,
Kinnelon,
Madison Township,
Mendham,
Mendham Township,
Mine Hill Township,
Morris Township,
Morristown Town,
Mount Arlington Borough,
Randolph Township,
Rockaway Borough,
Rockaway Township,
Victory Gardens Borough,
West Milford,
Wharton Borough

District 26

Bloomingdale,
Boonton,
Denville Township,
East Hanover Township,
Florham Park Borough,
Hanover Township,
Lincoln Park Borough,
Montville Township,
Morris Plains Borough,
Mountain Lakes,
Parsippany-Troy Hills Township,
Pequannock Township,
Pompton Lakes Borough,
Ringwood,
Riverdale Borough,
Wanaque

District 27

Clifton,
Livingston Township,
Millburn,
Montclair,
Roseland Borough,
West Orange Township

District 28

Hillside,
Irvington Township,
Maplewood,
Newark City (partial),
South Orange

District 29

East Newark,
Harrison,
Newark City (partial)

District 30

Avon-by-the-Sea,
Belmar,
Farmingdale Borough,
Howell Township,
Lake Como,
Lakewood Township,
Wall

District 31

Bayonne,
Jersey City (partial),
Kearny

District 32

Hoboken,
Jersey City (partial)

District 33

Guttenberg Town,
North Bergen,
Secaucus,
Union City,
Weehawken Township,
West New York Town

District 34

Belleville,
Bloomfield,
East Orange,
Glen Ridge Township,
Nutley,
Orange

District 35

Elmwood Park,
Garfield,
Haledon Borough,
North Haledon Borough,
Paterson City,
Prospect Park Borough

District 36

Carlstadt Borough,
Cliffside Park,
East Rutherford Borough,
Edgewater,
Fairview,
Lyndhurst Township,
North Arlington Borough,
Passaic,
Ridgefield,
Rutherford Borough,
Wallington Borough,
Wood-Ridge Borough

District 37

Bogota Borough,
Englewood City,
Englewood Cliffs Borough,
Fort Lee,
Hackensack City,
Leonia Borough,
Palisades Park Borough,
Ridgefield Park Village,
Teaneck Township,
Tenafly Borough

District 38

Bergenfield,
Fair Lawn Borough,
Glen Rock,
Hasbrouck Heights Borough,
Little Ferry Borough,
Lodi Borough,
Maywood,
Moonachie,
New Mildford,
Oradell,
Paramus Borough,
River Edge,
Rochelle Park,
Saddle Brook Township,
South Hackensack Township,
Teterboro Borough

District 39

Allendale Borough,
Alpine Borough,
Closter Borough,
Cresskill Borough,
Demarest Borough,
Dumont Borough,
Emerson Borough,
Harrington Park Borough,
Haworth Borough,
Hillsdale Borough,
Ho-Ho-Kus Borough,
Mahwah,
Midland Park,
Montvale Borough,
Northvale Borough,
Norwood Borough,
Oakland,
Old Tappan Borough,
Park Ridge Borough,
Ramsey Borough,
River Vale Township,
Rockleigh Borough,
Saddle River Borough,
Upper Saddle River Borough,
Waldwick Borough,
Washington Township,
Westwood Borough,
Woodcliff Lake Borough,

District 40

Caldwell,
Cedar Grove Township,
Essex Fells,
Franklin Lakes Borough,
Fairfield,
Hawthorne,
Little Falls Township,
North Caldwell,
Ridgewood Village,
Totowa Borough,
Verona Township,
Wayne Township,
Woodland Park Borough,
Wyckoff Township

References

External links
New Jersey Legislature Web Site

Politics of New Jersey
New Jersey legislative districts